Napoleon at Waterloo is a 1984 video game published by Krentek Software.

Gameplay
Napoleon at Waterloo is a game in which the player controls Napoleon while the computer commands the forces of Wellington at the Battle of Waterloo.

Reception
Mark Bausman reviewed the game for Computer Gaming World, and stated that "The mechanics are easy to master and the game responds quickly to the joystick."

Reviews
Computer Gaming World - Oct, 1990

References

External links
Review in Antic
Review in ROM Magazine

1984 video games
Atari 8-bit family games
Commodore 64 games
Computer wargames
Napoleonic Wars video games
Turn-based strategy video games
Video games developed in the United States
Video games set in the Netherlands
Works about the Battle of Waterloo